Paruwrobates is a genus of frogs in the family Dendrobatidae. The frogs are found in the Pacific slopes of the Andes in southern Colombia and northern Ecuador.

There are three species in Paruwrobates:
Paruwrobates andinus
Paruwrobates erythromos
Paruwrobates whymperi

References

Poison dart frogs
Frogs of South America
Amphibian genera